King House, also known as King-Bazemore House, is a historic plantation house located near Windsor, Bertie County, North Carolina. It was built in 1763, and is a -story, frame dwelling with brick ends.  It has a gambrel roof and features two interior T-stack end chimneys. It is one of two known gambrel roofed dwellings with brick ends in North Carolina.

It was added to the National Register of Historic Places in 1971.

References

Plantation houses in North Carolina
Houses on the National Register of Historic Places in North Carolina
Houses completed in 1763
Houses in Bertie County, North Carolina
National Register of Historic Places in Bertie County, North Carolina